Gerino Gerini may refer to:

Gerino Gerini (racing driver) (1928–2013), Italian racing driver
Gerino da Pistoia (1480–1529), Italian Renaissance painter